The Valtellina War (1620–1626) was an episode of the Thirty Years' War arising out of competition to control the Valtelline, an Alpine valley forming a key part of the Spanish Road.

Background
Valtelline, in Northern Italy, was vitally important to the communications between the Spanish and Austrian branches of the House of Habsburg through the Spanish Road. The Sforzas had ceded the territory to the Grison League, but there were religious conflicts because Valtelline natives were Catholic and the Grison were Protestant. Seeing an opportunity, the Spanish incited a revolt in Valtelline and eventually controlled the valley. Realizing the danger, in 1623, Venice, the Duke of Savoy, and France formed an alliance to capture this strategic position by signing the Treaty of Paris (1623). Spain tried to maintain peace by allowing the Papacy, over which they had great influence, to control the area. France did nothing as the Papal troops of Gregory XV established control over Valtelline due to the lackluster policies of Charles de La Vieuville. Gregory XV was soon afterwards succeeded by Pope Urban VIII.

Course of war

With the ascendancy of Cardinal Richelieu, French policy changed. Richelieu had no difficulty in persuading Louis XIII that if Spain gained control of the Valtellina valleys, it would unite them with possessions of the house of Austria, doubling the power of this house, and remove the only obstacle to its universal domination, exposing the independence of all of Europe, "shackling Christendom, making the Pope the chaplain of the Habsburgs", and excluding France from Italian affairs.

They claimed that because their ally the Duke of Savoy was attacking Genoa, by attacking Valtelline they diverted the resources of the Spanish, who were supporters of Genoa. The French had no difficulty winning over Swiss Protestants who were happy to see the French support their co-religionists in Valtellina. On November 24, 1624, 5000-6000 French troops under François Annibal d'Estrées entered Valtellina through Poschiavo. French troops quickly expelled Papal troops from the valley. The irony of a Cardinal attacking the troops of a Pope was not lost on Rome, Spain, and ultra-Catholics in France.

In March 1625, François de Bonne de Lesdiguières linked up with the Duke of Savoy and defeated Genoese and Spanish forces, driving them out of some of their positions. The Pope could not afford to lose the crucial forts in the Valtellina and began to organise a force of 6,000 men to retake the valley.

Result

Urban VIII sent Cardinal Francesco Barberini, his nephew, as legate to Paris to seek peace in 1625; he was also authorized by Spain. The result was the Treaty of Monzón. France's allies were not included in the negotiations and this led to resentment. Ultimately they felt that France had fought the war merely for its own benefit. Richelieu had to pacify his allies following this and pretend that he was not satisfied with the peace. Ultimately though, France had achieved its strategic objectives from the war in preventing Habsburg control over the Valtellina. French forces remained in the Valley until 1627, when they withdrew.

References

Bibliography
 
 
Thirty Years' War
Louis XIII
Pope Urban VIII
Pope Gregory XV
Lombardy
House of Habsburg
Philip IV of Spain
Valtellina War
European history articles needing expert attention